The 2014 World Artistic Gymnastics Championships was held in Nanning, China at the Guangxi Gymnasium from 3–12 October 2014. The competition was the fourth time a World Artistic Gymnastics Championships has been held in the continent of Asia.

Competition schedule
All times are CST (UTC+8).

Venues

Main Arena
The main arena where the competition was held was the Guangxi Gymnasium, which opened in 2012.

Training Gymnasium
The training facility for the competition was held at the Li Ning Sports Park. As per any International Gymnastics Federation competition format, there was a podium training session where the gymnast trains on the podium in the arena to get a feel for the competition equipment on a raised surface.

Mascots
In April 2013, the mascots Nannan (male) and Ningning (female) were unveiled as the official mascots of the event.

Medalists
Names with an asterisk (*) denote the team alternate.

Medal table

Men

Women

Men's results

Team competition

Individual all-around
In the men's all-around final, only two gymnasts per country can compete. Ryohei Kato and Shogo Nonomura of Japan, Lin Chaopan of China, Max Whitlock and Daniel Keatings of Great Britain, and Nikita Ignatyev of Russia were among those who had earned scores in the qualification round high enough to qualify for the individual all-around final, but could not compete due to the two-per-country rule. On October 8, Nile Wilson withdrew from the all-around final due to a wrist injury, and his teammate, Max Whitlock, competed in his place. On that day, it was also announced that Alexander Shatilov of Israel had pulled out of the competition and would be replaced by reserve athlete Ferhat Arıcan of Turkey.

Kōhei Uchimura of Japan once again made history by winning his fifth consecutive World all-around title.

Floor
2011 World champion and 2013 bronze medalist on floor Kohei Uchimura qualified in 5th, but did not progress to the final because his Japanese teammates Kenzo Shirai and Ryohei Kato qualified ahead of him.

Pommel Horse
After failing to make the finals in Antwerp in 2013, 2011 World and 2012 Olympic champion Krisztián Berki reclaimed his title on his specialty.

Rings
Reigning Olympic and defending World champion Arthur Zanetti was edged out by newcomer Liu Yang by 0.200.

Vault
Reigning Olympic and 2-time World champion Yang Hak-Seon failed to defend his title or even make the podium because he fell on both of his vaults. The 2007 World bronze medalist Ri Se-Gwang grabbed his first world title. Only Yang Hak-Seon and Ri Se-Gwang attempted two top 6.4 difficulty vaults with the former failing at both the Yang Hak Seon on vault and Tsukahara 3½, and latter succeeding in the Ri Se Gwang and Ri Se Gwang 2 on vault. Yang was trying to successfully complete the Tsukahara 3½ to become his second eponymous skill on men's vault, but since he fell on landing, his attempt was only credited for its difficulty score and not his name. Yang was the top qualifier, despite using two 6.0-difficulty vaults in qualifying before increasing them to two 6.4s in the final. Gwang used own 6.4s in all rounds. Shirai's lower difficulty of 5.6 of his second vault, which was also the only vault performed in the finals with a difficulty less than 6.0, was a contributor significant enough to miss him a spot on the podium here as he only trailed American Jacob Dalton in an average combined score by just 0.137, a deduction on landing equivalent to a small step.

Parallel bars
Reigning World champion Lin Chaopan of China failed to qualify for the final, placing 17th in qualifications. Former World champion Kōhei Uchimura failed to qualify due to the two-per-country rule, with his teammates Ryohei Kato and Yusuke Tanaka qualifying ahead of him.

Horizontal bar
Reigning Olympic and defending World champion Epke Zonderland successfully took home the gold on horizontal bar. 2013 World silver medalist Fabian Hambüchen failed to qualify. He finished in 22nd place with a score of 14.366.

Women's results

Team competition

Individual all-around
Only two athletes per country are allowed to compete in this event. The following athletes scored enough to qualify for the individual all-around final but did not compete due to the two-per-country rule: Mykayla Skinner of the United States (6th), Madison Kocian of the United States (14th), and Ekaterina Kramarenko of Russia (15th).

Simone Biles successfully defended her title. Larisa Iordache gave Romania its first medal of the 2014 Worlds with a silver. 2013 World all-around silver medalist Kyla Ross took the bronze. Russia's Aliya Mustafina placed fourth, not making the podium for only the second time in her senior career after falling on floor.

Vault
Reigning 2011 and 2013 World champion McKayla Maroney missed the competition to recover from a knee injury. She was the only 2013 World champion not to compete in Nanning. 2008 Olympic champion and 2013 World bronze medalist Hong Un-jong claimed her first world title on vault, the first North Korean World champion since Kim Gwang-Suk in 1991. Simone Biles claimed silver again as she did in 2013, and Mykayla Skinner grabbed her first individual medal, a bronze.

Uneven bars
Due to the two-per-country rule, Tan Jiaxin of China and Ekaterina Kramarenko of Russia were not able to compete in the final due to other members of their national team qualifying ahead of them. 2013 World champion Huang Huidan settled for the silver by 0.067 to her compatriot Yao Jinnan, who claimed her first World championship gold medal. 2014 European bronze medalist Daria Spiridonova grabbed another bronze at her first World Championships, edging out Ashton Locklear by 0.017.

Balance beam
Due to the two-per-country rule, Shang Chunsong and Huang Huidan of China were not able to compete in the final as they qualified behind teammates Yao Jinnan and Bai Yawen. 2013 World champion Aliya Mustafina of Russia had a hiccup in her routine and did not complete a required acrobatic series, and despite a 0.5 deduction, claimed the bronze over Asuka Teramoto of Japan by 0.066. 2013 World bronze medalist Simone Biles claimed her third gold medal of the competition on beam, 0.067 over silver medalist Bai Yawen of China.

Floor
Simone Biles successfully defended her title from 2013, her fourth gold medal in Nanning and ninth overall. 2013 World bronze medalist Larisa Iordache grabbed the silver, and 2012 Olympic Floor bronze medalist Aliya Mustafina edged out Mykayla Skinner by 0.033 to claim the bronze, her 11th medal overall.

References

External links
 

 
2014
World Artistic Gymnastics Championships
World Artistic Gymnastics Championships
World Artistic Gymnastics Championships
International gymnastics competitions hosted by China
Sport in Guangxi